Out Run Europa is a racing video game developed by Probe Software and published by U.S. Gold for the Amiga, Amstrad CPC, Atari ST, Commodore 64, Game Gear, Master System, and ZX Spectrum in 1991. Only the Game Gear version was released in North America. It is a spin-off of Sega's 1986 arcade game Out Run.

Levels in Out Run Europa are set across Europe, with the player passing road signs for places like Paris and Berlin. The player must escape from the police using a variety of vehicles, from the standard sports cars from Ferrari and Porsche to motorbikes and jet skis.

Synopsis
The player suddenly has his car taken by someone, and watches roll in the distance. The player, however, finds an abandoned motorcycle, and uses it to pursue his car.

Development
Out Run Europa's development was first announced in 1988 and the game's release was delayed until 1991.

Reception
The Spectrum version was well received, with Your Sinclair awarding the game 83%, and praising the big sprites and smooth animation when compared to the original game.

Console XS reviewed the Sega Master System version, giving it a 90% score.

References

1991 video games
Amiga games
Amstrad CPC games
Atari ST games
Commodore 64 games
Game Gear games
OutRun
Master System games
U.S. Gold games
Video games set in Europe
ZX Spectrum games
Video games scored by Matt Furniss
Video games set in Paris
Video games set in Berlin
Video games set in London
Video games set in Rome
Europe-exclusive video games
Single-player video games
Video games developed in the United Kingdom